Bae Hyun-sung (born May 3, 1999) is a South Korean actor under Awesome ENT. He starred in the Korean web series Love Playlist, the television series Extraordinary You (2019) and Our Blues (2022).

Career

2018–present: Acting debut
Bae started his career as an actor and made his debut in the web series Love Playlist. He made several cameos in films such as The Divine Fury (2019), The Most Ordinary Romance (2019) and on television series like What's Wrong with Secretary Kim (2018). He was starred in the fourth season of Love Playlist, reprising his role as Park Ha-neul and partners Kim Sae-ron. He was also part of the school fantasy drama Extraordinary You (2019) and of the critically acclaimed tv series Hospital Playlist. One of the most important role he played was in the drama Our Blues acclaimed positively by the audience.

Filmography

Film

Television series

Web series

Awards and nominations

References

External links
Bae Hyun-sung at Awesome ENT 
 
 
 

1999 births
Living people
South Korean male film actors
South Korean male television actors
South Korean male web series actors
21st-century South Korean male actors